Aphnaeus hutchinsonii, the Hutchinson's silver spot or Hutchinson's high-flier, is a butterfly of the family Lycaenidae. It is found in South Africa, Botswana, Mozambique, from Zimbabwe through eastern Africa to Somalia. In South Africa it is found from northern KwaZulu-Natal to Gauteng, Mpumalanga and Limpopo.

Adults are on wing from September to January with a peak from October to November. There is one generation per year.

The larvae feed on Acacia robusta, Burkea africana, Loranthus and Viscum species. The larvae are attended by ants.

References

External links
Die Gross-Schmetterlinge der Erde 13: Die Afrikanischen Tagfalter. Plate XIII 69 d

Butterflies described in 1887
Aphnaeus
Butterflies of Africa
Taxa named by Roland Trimen